Ibrahim Khalid Ibrahim Al-Nafei (born 1967) is a Bahraini politician, activist, and columnist. He was sworn into the Council of Representatives on December 12, 2018 for the Second District of the Muharraq Governorate.

Biography

Al-Nafei entered politics by running for the Second District of the Muharraq Governorate in the 2018 Bahraini general election. He won 1,458 votes for 23.89% in the first round on November 24, requiring a run-off on December 1, in which he defeated his opponent Ibrahim al-Hammadi by winning 2,932 votes for 53.28%.

References	

Members of the Council of Representatives (Bahrain)
Bahraini activists
1967 births
Living people